The Itchyworms is a Filipino rock band. The band is composed of Jazz Nicolas on drums, Jugs Jugueta on guitars, Kelvin Yu on bass guitars, and Chino Singson on lead guitars. The group made their name in the OPM (Original Pilipino Music) scene in 2006 with their second album, Noontime Show, with songs such as "Akin Ka Na Lang" and "Beer".

Personnel

Current members
 Jazz Nicolas – lead vocals, drums, piano, keyboards, keytar (1996–present) 
 Jugs Jugueta – co-lead vocals, rhythm guitar, percussion, keyboards (1996–present)
 Kelvin Yu – bass guitar, backing vocals (1997–present); lead guitar (1996-1997)
 Chino Singson – lead guitar, backing vocals (1997–present)

Early member
Haji Cruz – bass guitar, backing vocals (1996–1997)

History

Early years
Formed in 1996, the band consisted of Jazz Nicolas, Jugs Jugueta, Kelvin Yu (then on lead guitar) and Hadrian "Haji" Cruz (then on bass). The band performed at various school-based events and competitions with a handful of original songs and Beatles covers. Unfortunately, communication and scheduling issues forced Cruz to leave the group. This predicament forced Yu to take up the bass guitar vacancy, effectively making the band a trio.

The group continued as a trio until the middle of 1997, when a common friend in the Ateneo Musicians' Pool recruited Chino Singson to play guitar with the group at a school event. Singson eventually went on to become a permanent member, which solidified the group's current lineup.

In 1998 the band put together Revenge of the Unsigned, their first official CD. They did this with the help of their manager, Earnest Mangulabnan-Zabala, the Eraserheads, Ely Buendia, Buddy Zabala and Romel "Sancho" Sanchez (Loquy, Cynthia Alexander). The band intended for Revenge to be their independently released debut album in the event that no major record label would sign them.

As luck would have it, then-A&R manager at Viva/Neo Records Mike Dizon (Teeth, Sandwich) got hold of Revenge. He helped push for Viva executives to sign the band and eventually release Little Monsters Under Your Bed.

Little Monsters, the band's first major-label album, was released in 2001 and contained songs from Revenge and new compositions by Nicolas and Jugueta. The song "Antipara" was probably the most well-known song on the album. The release of the album was deemed somewhat ill-timed, as its glossy pop-rock sound was an aberration in the Korn-influenced OPM Rock landscape of the late 1990s to early 2000s.

Noontime Show (2005)
On October 11, 2005, the Itchyworms released Noontime Show, which gave them modest national success and industry recognition. Buddy Zabala and Raimund Marasigan, by this time both former Eraserheads, co-produced the album with the group.

Most notably, the album went on to become Album of the Year at the 2006 NU Rock Awards, with Nicolas winning Drummer of the Year and the group winning Producer of the Year jointly with Marasigan and Zabala.

Commercial performances
The song "Akin Ka Na Lang" has been used by KFC and Close-Up in separate television advertisements. In 2008, Pringles used "Salapi" for a nationwide campaign/songwriting contest. In addition, Enervon, Close-Up and San Miguel Beer commissioned the band to write original songs for their advertising campaigns.

The band also wrote and performed "Kabataang Pinoy", the theme song for the first season of ABS-CBN's Pinoy Big Brother: Teen Edition. This is arguably the band's most widely publicized song because of the series' popularity and media exposure. They also performed the station ID "Para Sa 'yo Kapatid" of TV5.

Recent achievements 
In early 2016, songwriter Davey Langit asked the band to interpret "Dalawang Letra", his entry to the Himig Handog P-Pop Love Songs competition. The song won the top prize at the finals night in April 2016. In July 2016, the band's drummer/vocalist Jazz Nicolas, with songwriting partner Wally Acolola, won the PhilPop grand prize with their composition "Di Na Muli", also performed by the Itchyworms.

In August of the same year, the band released "Pariwara", a song written in collaboration with Ely Buendia. According to Buendia, the song had been in his chest of unfinished ideas since the days of the Eraserheads. The song remained unused until early 2016, when vocalist Jugs Jugueta asked about any partial songs Buendia may have had lying around. Buendia gave the Itchyworms "Pariwara", and Jugueta and Nicolas delivered more lyrics and a new bridge. Buendia and the Itchyworms then got together at his home studio, known as the Bunker, to hash out a final arrangement.

Influences
Although the individual members of the band draw on distinct influences, their common affection for The Beatles and Eraserheads heavily defines the quartet's musical sound.

Discography
To date the Itchyworms have released five full-length studio albums and one EP. They have also contributed songs to numerous compilations, most notably including the Kami nAPO Muna and Kami nAPO Muna Ulit tribute albums. In 2014 they launched their fourth full-length studio album, After All This Time. This new deluxe edition of the album contains six bonus tracks aside from the ten main tracks. These include the current single "Ayokong Tumanda", the title track "After All This Time", and a remake of the classic Juan de la Cruz song "Panahon".

Studio albums
Little Monsters Under Your Bed (Viva/Neo Records, 2001)
Noontime Show (Universal Records, 2005)
Self-Titled (Sony BMG Philippines, July 8, 2008)
After All This Time (Independently released, 2013)
Waiting for the End to Start (Sony Music Philippines, 2020)

EPs 

 And the Worm Jumped Over the Moon (Independently released, 2003)
 After All This Time (Independently released, 2013)

Anthology album appearances
 "Happy House" - Songs from NU107 In The Raw (Sony Music, 1998, also re-recorded for Little Monsters Under Your Bed)
 Pulp Freakshow (Viva/Neo Records, 2001)
 Gimik Nation (Viva/Neo Records, 2002)
 "Awit Ng Barkada" - Kami nAPO Muna (Universal Records, 2006)
 "Season Of Smiles" - Close-Up Season of Smiles Christmas CD (Universal Records, 2006)
 Astig...The Biggest Band Hits (Universal Records, 2006)
 AYUZ! Pinoy Alternative's Power Cuts (Viva/Neo Records, 2006)
 SUPER -  The Biggest OPM Hits Of The Year (Universal Records, 2007)
 "Princesa" - Kami nAPO Muna Ulit (Universal Records, 2007)
 "Kabataang Pinoy" - Musika Sa Bahay Ni Kuya: The Best Of Pinoy Big Brother Hits (Star Music, 2008)
 Gusto Ko Ng Rock (Sony Music, 2009)
 I-Star 15: The Best of Inspirational Songs (Star Music, 2010)
 "Maling Akala" - The Reunion: An Eraserheads Tribute Album (Star Music, 2012)
 "Dalawang Letra" by Davey Langit - Himig Handog P-Pop Love Songs 2016 The Album (Star Music, 2016)
 Super Astig Hits (Universal Records, 2016)

Singles
"Antipara" (2001)
"Buwan" (2005)
"Akin Ka Na Lang" (2006)
"Beer" (2006)
"Awit ng Barkada" (Original by APO, 2006)
"Kabataang Pinoy" (Pinoy Big Brother Teen Edition Theme, 2006)
"Salapi" (2006)
"Love Team" (2007)
"Princesa" (Original by APO, 2007)
"Penge Naman Ako N'yan" (2008)
"Freak-Out, Baby" (2009)
"Gusto Ko Lamang Sa Buhay" (Mutya ng Masa Theme/When I Met U soundtrack, 2009)
"Misis Fely Nimfa Ang Pangalan" (2009)
"Suplado Ka Pala sa Personal" (2010)
"Gaano Ko Ikaw Kamahal" (2011)
"Maling Akala" (Original by Eraserheads, 2012)
"After All This Time" (2013)
"Ayokong Tumanda" (2013)
"Huwag Na Sana 'kong Gumising Mag-isa" (2014)
"In Love Ako Sa'yo" (2015)
"Panahon" (Featuring Pepe Smith, 2015)
"Rainy Day" (2015)
"Dalawang Letra" (2016, Grand Winner of Himig Handog P-Pop Love Songs 2016)
"'Di Na Muli" (2016)
"Pariwara" (Featuring Ely Buendia, 2016)
"Lutang" (Featuring Ely Buendia, 2017)
"Sisikat Muli Ang Araw" (2017)
"Loco" (2018)
"我真不想变老 - Wo zhen bu xiang bian lao" (Chinese version of "Ayokong Tumanda", 2019)
"Ang Ating Tagumpay" (with Sponge Cola) (2019)
"Malinaw Na Malabo Na Tayo" (Featuring Ely Buendia, 2019)
"Armageddon Blues" (2020)
"The Silence" (2020)
"I-Boogie Mo Ako Baby" (Featuring The CompanY, 2020)
"Same Day" (2020)
"The Life I Know" (2020)
"After All This Time (Under the Weather Version) (2020)
"Out of Time" (2020)
"Sisikat Muli Ang Araw (Acoustic version)" (2020)
"Eto Na (Ang Maliligayang Araw)" (2021)

Other projects
Itchyworms lead singer Jugs Jugueta is also a TV noontime host and comedian on It's Showtime on ABS-CBN 2. He has also guested in various TV shows on Channel 2 including Matanglawin, Panahon Ko To, I Can See Your Voice, "ASAP Natin To", Minute To Win It Last Man Standing and has been seen on Kapamilya Deal Or No Deal. Jugueta has also guested in Maynila on GMA Channel 7 where The Itchyworms also performed. Jugueta, together with his longtime best friend Rocksteddy frontman Teddy Corpuz, was also an actor in a Holy Week Lenten drama special on It's Showtime that was held every Holy Week of every year from 2013 to 2016.. In 2019, Jugueta and Corpuz hosted a Lenten documentary special of It's Showtime instead of their traditional Lenten drama special.

Jazz Nicolas also guested on MYX Olympics, a popular quiz show on MYX Channel in 2016.

Awards and nominations

References

External links
The Itchyworms official website 
The Itchyworms' official merch shop
The Itchyworms' Spotify
The Itchyworms' Twitter
The Itchyworms' Instagram

Filipino rock music groups
Musical groups from Metro Manila
Musical groups established in 1996
Sony Music Philippines artists